Arcetri is a location in Florence, Italy, positioned among the hills south of the city centre.


Landmarks
A number of historic buildings are situated there, including the house of the famous scientist Galileo Galilei (called Villa Il Gioiello),
the Convent of San Matteo and the Torre del Gallo. The Arcetri Observatory is also located there. The church of San Leonardo in Arcetri is the main church of the area.

Galileo Galilei died there on 8 January 1642.

List of landmarks
The following is a longer list of landmarks in the Arcetri area, with their Italian names:

San Leonardo in Arcetri (Saint Leonard at Arcetri Church)
San Matteo in Arcetri (Saint Matthew at Arcetri Church)
Osservatorio Astrofisico di Arcetri (Arcetri Astrophysical Observatory)
Pian dei Giullari (Jesters Plateau)
Villa Capponi
Villa Il Giullarino
Villa di Volsanminiato
Torre del Gallo (Tower of the Rooster)
Villa La Gallina
Villa Agape-Arrighetti
Villa Giramonte
Villa Giovannelli
Villa Nunes Vais
Villa Il Teatro
Villa Pian dei Giullari
Villa Masieri
Villa Il Gioiello
Villa Le Corti
Villa Pazzi
Villa Ravà
Villa Il Roseto
Fondazione Spadolini (Spadolini Foundation)
Monteripaldi
San Michele a Monteripaldi (Saint Michel at Monteripaldi Church)
Santa Margherita a Montici (Saint Margaret at Montici Church)

See also
Tommaso Perelli

References

Districts of Florence